This is a list of countries and territories where Russian is an official language:

Highest nationwide status or nationwide status of the state language

Second highest nationwide status or nationwide status of the official language

Any other status defined by constitution, nationwide recognised minority language or similar status

Status in dependencies or regions

See also 
 Geographical distribution of Russian speakers

References 

Countries and territories